The SAT Khorat Open was a professional tennis tournament played on outdoor hard courts. It was part of the ATP Challenger Tour. The tournament was held in Khorat, Thailand once, in 2009.

Past finals

Singles

Doubles

External links
ITF search

SAT Khorat Open
2009 establishments in Thailand
2009 disestablishments in Thailand
Tennis
ATP Challenger Tour
Hard court tennis tournaments
March sporting events
Recurring sporting events established in 2009
Recurring events disestablished in 2009
Tennis
Tennis tournaments in Thailand
Defunct tennis tournaments in Thailand